The Tudeh fraction was the parliamentary group of the Tudeh Party in the Iranian Parliament.

The group was known for its robust discipline, and its ability to dominate debates in the parliament. During the 14th Iranian Majlis, the party formed a left-center coalition with deputies (mostly from northern provinces) who sympathized with its policies, gaining a voting strength of about 30.

Historical membership

References 

Iranian Parliament fractions
1944 establishments in Iran
Affiliated organizations of the Tudeh Party of Iran